The administrative entities that are a level below of Districts are named as Subdivisions in Assam. Since India's independence in 1947, the administrative entities of Assam have increased over a period of time. With 54 subdivisions initially, the Government of Assam incorporated 24 more subdivisions with 5 new districts on 26 January 2016, increasing the count to 78. Where the subdivisions are the administrative units, the terms, such as Tehsils or Mandals represent revenue collecting units under a district administration, and both are treated as sub–districts. Assam has 155 Tehsils, and a few fall under multiple districts, specially the districts in BTC and its surrounding. In present the total number of subdivisions are 78.

Notes 

  Formation of Silchar municipal region, 1922.
  Formation of Dhubri municipal region, 1883.
  Formation of Dibrugarh municipal region, 1873.
  Formation of Goalpara municipal region, 1875.
  Formation of Golaghat municipal region, 1920.
  Formation of Jorhat municipal region, 1909.
  Formation of Guwahati municipal region, constituted as a Town committee in 1853. 
  Guwahati municipal region reconstituted under a Municipal board in 1873.
  Guwahati municipal region upgraded to a Municipal corporation in 1974.
  Formation of Nagaon municipal region, 1893.
  Formation of Tezpur municipal region, 1894.

References 

Subdivisions of Assam
Subdivisions
Assam
Assam